Rae was a racing car constructor. Rae cars competed in one FIA World Championship race - the 1950 Indianapolis 500.

World Championship Indy 500 results

Formula One constructors (Indianapolis only)
American racecar constructors